Karl Pavlovich Bryullov (12 December 1799 – 11 June 1852), original name Charles Bruleau, also transliterated Briullov and Briuloff, and referred to by his friends as "Karl the Great", was a Russian painter. He is regarded as a key figure in transition from the Russian neoclassicism to romanticism.

Biography 
Karl Bryullov was born on 12 (23) December 1799 in St. Petersburg, in the family of the academician, woodcarver, and engraver Pavel Ivanovich Briullo (Brulleau, 1760—1833) who was of Huguenot descent. He felt drawn to Italy from his early years. Despite his education at the Imperial Academy of Arts (1809–1821), Bryullov never fully embraced the classical style taught by his mentors and promoted by his brother, Alexander Bryullov. After distinguishing himself as a promising and imaginative student and finishing his education, he left Russia for Rome where he worked until 1835 as a portraitist and genre painter, though his fame as an artist came when he began doing historical painting.

His best-known work, The Last Day of Pompeii (1830–1833), is a vast composition compared by Pushkin and Gogol to the best works of Rubens and Van Dyck. It created a sensation in Italy and established Bryullov as one of the finest European painters of his day. After completing this work, he triumphantly returned to the Russian capital, where he made many friends among the aristocracy and intellectual elite and obtained a high post in the Imperial Academy of Arts.

An anecdote concerning Bryullov appeared in Leo Tolstoy's essay "Why Do Men Stupefy Themselves?" and later in the same author's book What Is Art?.

While teaching at the academy (1836–1848) he developed a portrait style which combined a neoclassical simplicity with a romantic tendency that fused well, and his penchant for realism was satisfied with an intriguing level of psychological penetration. While he was working on the plafond of St Isaac's Cathedral, his health suddenly deteriorated. Following advice of his doctors, Bryullov left Russia for Madeira in 1849 and spent the last three years of his life in Italy. He died in the village of Manziana near Rome and is buried at the Cimitero Acattolico there.

Characteristics of art 
Bryullov's work is the pinnacle of late Russian Romanticism when the sense of harmonic wholeness and beauty of the world is replaced by a feeling of tragedy and conflict of life. In the forefront of the historical picture, but its main theme - not the struggle of heroes, as in classicism, and the fate of the huge human masses. In his central work "The Last Day of Pompeii" Bryullov combined the drama of action, romantic lighting effects and sculptural plasticity of figures. The painting brought the artist great fame both in Russia and in Europe.

An outstanding master of both ceremonial and chamber portraits, Bryullov evolved in his art from the joyful embrace of life in his early works to the intricate psychologism of his later ones, thus anticipating the achievements of such artists like Ilya Repin in the second half of the 19th century. Bryullov had an enormous influence on Russian artists, among whom he had many followers and imitators.

Selected artwork

See also 
 List of Russian artists

References and notes

Literature

External links

Paintings by Bryullov Karl - high res
Online gallery of Briullov paintings
Brullov's paintings at the Russian Art Gallery
Karl Brulloff. The Last Day of Pompeii

1799 births
1852 deaths
Painters from Saint Petersburg
People from Sankt-Peterburgsky Uyezd
Russian people of French descent
Russian people of German descent
Orientalist painters
Russian neoclassical painters
Russian romantic painters
19th-century painters from the Russian Empire
Imperial Academy of Arts alumni
Awarded with a large gold medal of the Academy of Arts
Burials in the Protestant Cemetery, Rome